The Australian Film Institute Award for Best Direction in Television is awarded annually by the Australian Film Institute as part of the awards in television for excellence in direction. Prior to 1990, two awards existed and were called Best Direction in a Mini Series and Best Direction in a Telefeature. The awards were merged in 1990 to become Best Direction in a Telefeature or Mini Series which in 1991 was renamed Best Achievement in Direction in a Television Drama. In 2004, this award became Best Direction in Television.

Best Direction in a Mini Series

Best Direction in a Telefeature

Best Direction in a Telefeature or Mini Series

Best Achievement in Direction in a Television Drama

Best Direction in Television

See also
 Australian Film Institute
 AFI Awards
 Australian Film Institute Television Awards

References

Australian Film Institute Awards
AACTA Awards